Gurdwara Shanghai is the former site of a Sikh in the Hongkou District, China and is a registered cultural relic  It was built from 1907 to 1908 to meet the religious needs of Indian patrolmen and Sikhs who had come over with the British. The site is now a residence and serves as a community health clinic.

References

See Also 
Sikhism in China

Gurdwaras
Sikhism

Hongkou District